"Frozen" is the first single by Jamaican, Reggae fusion artist, Tami Chynn, featuring Akon. The song is the first single for the now cancelled album, Prima Donna, which was to be released through SRC Records/Universal Mowtown Records. The album was recorded through Konvict Muzik.

History
The song was released for download via iTunes in the United States on 29 April 2008 and was released in Japan on 14 May 2008. The song comes with remixes by the likes of Don Diablo, Mark Picchiotti and Ralphi Rosario.

Formats and track listings
Remix single
"Frozen (Ralphi Rosario Club Mix)" — 7:09
"Frozen (Ralphi Rosario Club Mix W/O Akon)" — 6:39
"Frozen (Extended Album Version)" — 6:59
"Frozen (Ralphi Rosario Retarded Dub)" — 11:59
"Frozen (Album Version)" — 3:40

12" Vynl
"Frozen (Album Version)" — 3:40
"Frozen (Instrumental)" — 3:40

Music video
The music video was directed by Gil Green in Los Angeles on Thanksgiving 2008. The video made its world premiere on MySpace on 2 December 2008.

Charts

Release history

References

2008 singles
Tami Chynn songs
Akon songs
Song recordings produced by Akon
Song recordings produced by RedOne
Music videos directed by Gil Green
SRC Records singles
2008 songs
Songs written by Snoop Dogg
Songs written by Bilal Hajji
Songs written by Rob Hyman
Songs written by RedOne
Songs written by Cyndi Lauper
Songs written by Akon